Mount Bevilacqua is a mostly ice-free mountain rising to ,  north of Mount Evans in the  Saint Johns Range of Victoria Land. The summit is situated at the union of Y-shaped ridge lines north of Mount Evans. It was named by the Advisory Committee on Antarctic Names in 2007 after Charles A. Bevilacqua, Civil Engineer Corps (CEC), U.S. Navy (Seabees), who at the time was the senior enlisted construction Builder Chief and member of the construction crew, which built the original McMurdo Station and the original South Pole Station in the 1955-57 pre-IGY period.

References

Bevilacqua
McMurdo Dry Valleys